is a Japanese anime director and animator. He started working in 2003 and after working on Fullmetal Alchemist: Brotherhood in 2009, he was put in charge of directing his first TV series with Space Dandy in 2014.

Biography
Shingo Natsume was born in Aomori Prefecture on September 26, 1980. He began working as an animator in 2003 and in 2009 he was put in charge of key animation for Fullmetal Alchemist: Brotherhood. Following the series' conclusion, he worked on The Tatami Galaxy a year later and eventually was given his first directorial role in a TV series with Space Dandy in 2014. Natsume then directed the first season of One-Punch Man, ACCA: 13-Territory Inspection Dept., and Boogiepop and Others in 2015, 2017, and 2019 respectively. In 2021, he was put in charge of creating an original anime TV series, Sonny Boy. At the 2022 Crunchyroll Anime Awards, Sonny Boy was nominated for anime of the year, and Natsume was also nominated for best director.

Filmography

References

External links
 

1980 births
Anime directors
Japanese animators
Japanese storyboard artists
Japanese television directors
Living people
People from Aomori Prefecture
Science Saru people